Michael Joshua Oliverius (born October 10, 1981) is an American former child actor better known by his stage name Michael Oliver.

Oliver is best known for his role as "Junior" in the first two Problem Child movies. He also played Sam Dalton In Dillinger and Capone in 1995.

Early life and career
Born in Los Angeles, California, Oliver's career started at the age of 2. His first job was as a model in a Sears catalog. At age 6, he appeared in a Chevron commercial where he wore glasses and had his voice dubbed over. After seeing Oliver in the Chevron commercial, a casting agent for the film Problem Child tracked Oliver down and cast him in the role days later.

When Problem Child was released in 1990, Oliver's appearance reminded people of a young Ron Howard as "Opie Taylor" in the Andy Griffith Show. It became a "surprise hit," spawned two sequels and an animated series. Problem Child 2 followed in 1991; however, the script was considered not in par with the original and repeatedly resorted to adult language, thus limiting the film's overall appeal.

On a 2011 episode of the radio show Loveline, Oliver called in while former co-star Gilbert Gottfried was guest hosting. On the 20th anniversary of both Problem Child and Problem Child 2, it was the first time the two actors have spoken to each other since 1991.

In 2015, it was reported that Oliver was happy with his private life away from the celebrity scene and had said he was enjoying "a nice, quiet existence" although he expressed he was grateful for the time he had spent in the spotlight as a child star.

Lawsuit with Universal Pictures
After completion of Problem Child 2, Universal Pictures sued Oliver's manager-mother Dianne Ponce for extorting his acting contract with the studio. Universal Pictures alleged that, on the eve of filming, Ponce threatened to remove her son from production unless his payment for the film was raised from $80,000 to $500,000.

A Superior Court jury ruled that the contract was unenforceable, Universal Pictures having entered into it under duress, and that Ponce and Oliver were obliged to return the difference between the $250,000 Universal had thus far paid and the $80,000 originally negotiated.

Filmography

Award nominations

References

External links

Young Artists Awards / Past Nominees and Winners

1981 births
Male actors from California
American male child actors
American male film actors
American male television actors
Living people
People from Greater Los Angeles